is a Japanese trading card arcade game based on the Dragon Ball franchise. It debuted on November 11, 2010 in Japan. In 2016, an update launched that improved the user experience in the form of enhanced graphics and easier accessibility of characters. This update was named . Several other games based on the series have been released for Nintendo 3DS, Nintendo Switch, and Microsoft Windows. Numerous manga adaptations have been published by Shueisha and a promotional anime adaptation by Toei Animation began being shown at public events in July 2018 before being uploaded online.

Gameplay
Players can choose a "hero avatar" from 8 races, each with 3 distinct battle types: Hero, Elite, or Berserker.
Players can collect various types of Dragon Balls other than the common variety, such as Ultimate Dragon Balls, Namekian Dragon Balls, Dark Dragon Balls, and the almighty Super Dragon Balls in.
Players use 7 cards and an IC card called hero license.
The game is also available in multiplayer mode.

Other releases
A port on Nintendo 3DS, named Dragon Ball Heroes: Ultimate Mission, was released on February 28, 2013 in Japan. A sequel, Dragon Ball Heroes: Ultimate Mission 2, was released on August 7, 2014. Dragon Ball Heroes: Ultimate Mission X was released on April 27, 2017.

In October 2018, a Nintendo Switch game titled Super Dragon Ball Heroes: World Mission was announced for release on April 4, 2019. It will include cards and characters from the first eight Super Dragon Ball Heroes arcade games and the first two versions of Super Dragon Ball Heroes: Universe Mission.

Adaptations

Manga

Dragon Ball Heroes was adapted into several manga series. , written and illustrated by Toyotarou, was serialized in Shueisha's V Jump magazine since November 2012. With 28 chapters, it is on hiatus as Toyotarou is drawing Dragon Ball Super. A chapter 29 was included in the Bandai Official 5th Anniversary Fanbook: Dragon Ball Heroes 5th Anniversary Mission book published on November 19, 2015 and all previous chapters were uploaded to the game's website for free.

, written and illustrated by Yoshitaka Nagayama, was serialized in Saikyō Jump from December 2013.

Nagayama also drew . Serialized in Saikyō Jump since August 5, 2016, its first collected volume was published on May 2, 2017 and its second on May 2, 2018.

Arcade
In Japanese stores there are arcade machines that run Super Dragon Ball Heroes. It is the source material for all Super Dragon Ball Heroes media (Manga, Games, and the Anime). It contains an entire story arc and multiple subplots that the anime and manga skipped. If you pay a small amount of yen the arcade will deposit a few cards. There are multiple rarities such as: R, SR, UR, CAMPAIN, SEC.
You can then use said cards and scan them on the machine to play the multiplayer mode.

Anime

In May 2018, V Jump announced a promotional anime for Super Dragon Ball Heroes that will adapt the game's Prison Planet arc. The first episode was shown at Aeon Lake Town, a shopping mall in Koshigaya, Saitama, on July 1, 2018 and was uploaded to the game's official website that same day. Likewise, the second episode was shown at Jump Victory Carnival Tokyo Kaijō on July 16 before being uploaded to the website.

Production
Dragon Ball creator Akira Toriyama supervised the game's designs and setting. He also designed the three Freeza clan characters.

Reception

Dragon Ball Heroes is the number one digital card game. By October 2016, the game sold 500million cards and grossed .

References

External links
Official website

2010 video games
2012 manga
2013 manga
2016 manga
Arcade video games
Bandai Namco games
Digital collectible card games
Dimps games
Heroes
Multiplayer and single-player video games
Nintendo 3DS games
Nintendo Switch games
Shōnen manga
Shueisha franchises
Shueisha manga
Video games developed in Japan